Miti or MITI may refer to:

People 
 Michela Miti (born 1963), Italian actress and television presenter 
 Mwape Miti (born 1973), Zambian footballer

Other uses 
 Miti, Estonia, a village
 Ministry of International Trade and Industry of Japan, now part of the Ministry of Economy, Trade and Industry
 Ministry of International Trade and Industry (Malaysia)
 Mohawk Innovative Technology, an American company
 Qualified Member of the Institute of Translation & Interpreting

See also 
 Mitis (disambiguation)